Mungeli is one of the 90 Legislative Assembly constituencies of Chhattisgarh state in India. It is in Mungeli district and is reserved for candidates belonging to the Scheduled Castes. It is also part of Bilaspur Lok Sabha constituency.

Previously, Mungeli was part of Madhya Pradesh Legislative Assembly until the state of Chhattisgarh was created in 2000.

Members of Legislative Assembly

As a constituency of Madhya Pradesh

As a constituency of Chhattisgarh

Election results

2018

See also
Mungeli district
 Mungeli
 List of constituencies of Chhattisgarh Legislative Assembly

References

Mungeli district
Assembly constituencies of Chhattisgarh